Roy Henry Wagner III (born January 12, 1947),  is an American cinematographer known for dramatic, dark imagery. Named by Kodak as one of the "Top 100 Directors of Photography in the World" Wagner's career has spanned 35 years in the motion picture and television industries. He has also received the ASC Award for Outstanding Achievement in Cinematography for a Miniseries, and is a two-time Primetime Emmy Award nominee. 

Wagner is a member of the Academy of Motion Picture Arts and Sciences and the American Society of Cinematographers and has won the Producers Guild "Vision Award".  He studied with Ansel Adams who taught him to rise to the challenge of new technology. Wagner is extremely active within the American Society of Cinematographers, and contributes much of his free time furthering the charter of the organization.

Filmography

Miscellaneous credits
 Visions of Light: The Art of Cinematography (1992 – Film, Committee Member: ASC education)

Quotes
 "I...would like to take the curse off of technology. There is no reason why any director should fear new ideas or technologies that might significantly contribute to their ability to tell stories."

References

External links
 
 An ASC Interview with Wagner
 Wagner's Mirror Trick (ASC Article)

American cinematographers
Living people
1947 births